The Nalchik is a river in Kabardino-Balkaria, Russia. It is a left tributary of the Urvan, which is a branch of the Cherek. It flows through the city Nalchik, the capital of Kabardino-Balkaria. Its banks are eroded to the point of needing fortifications.

References

Rivers of Kabardino-Balkaria